His Mercy Christian College is a Maths & Science centre that is located approximately 1 km from Borrowdale Police Station, Harare, Zimbabwe.

High schools in Zimbabwe